Several ships have been named Falmouth, possibly for Falmouth, Cornwall:

Falmouth, a Massachusetts brig active in 1782
 was built in America and entered Lloyd's Register in 1796. She became a Liverpool-based slave ship that a privateer captured during Falmouths first slave voyage.
 was launched at Liverpool as a slave ship. After the British slave trade ended in 1807, she became a West Indiaman until a privateer captured her in 1812.

See also
 - one of nine actual or planned vessels of the British Royal Navy

Ship names